Sir Ernest Irvine Goulding (1 May 1910 - 13 January 2000) was an English barrister and High Court judge between 1971 and 1985.  He was one of the first members of Wilberforce Chambers.

Biography 
Goulding was educated at the Merchant Taylors' School and St Catharine's College, Cambridge.

Cases 
Important decisions which Goulding J handed down included:
 Patel v Ali [1985] Ch 283 - on specific performance for breach of contract
 Sky Petroleum Ltd v VIP Petroleum Ltd [1974] 1 WLR 576 – also on specific performance
 Mutual Life Insurance Co of New York v Rank Organisation Ltd [1985] BCLC 11 – on unfair prejudice
 Chase Manhattan Bank NA v Israel-British Bank (London) Ltd [1981] Ch 105 – arguable his most famous decision, on tracing through international bank settlement systems – the decision has been subject to "sustained, authoritative criticism."
 Oppenheimer v Cattermole [1976] AC 249 - Goulding J had to decide whether a Nazi-era law expropriating Jewish property should be recognised; his refusal to recognise it was upheld by the House of Lords
 Hodgson v National and Local Government Officers Association [1972] 1 WLR 130 – concerning the governance of trade unions.
 Berry v Warnett (Inspector of Taxes) [1978] 1 WLR 957 - concerning tax avoidance.
 Schemmer v Property Resources Ltd [1975] Ch 273 - on recognition of a foreign receivership order.

Family 
He was father to Sir Marrack Goulding, a diplomat.

Arms

Footnotes

Chancery Division judges
1910 births
2000 deaths
Knights Bachelor
British barristers
British King's Counsel
People educated at Merchant Taylors' School, Northwood
Alumni of St Catharine's College, Cambridge